Hurmuzachi (Hurmuzaki, Hurmuzache) is a noble Romanian family from Bukovina of Greek origin. During the 17th-19th centuries they were associated with the Cernăuca estate in Bukovina.

History 
The most prominent members were the Hurmuzachi brothers. Their father was Doxaki (Doxachi, Doxache, Doxaki) Hurmuzaki (d. April 1857), who eventually re-acquired Cernăuca after the documents of the ownership of the estate by the family had been lost and built a new boier palace and church and planted park there. Doxaki married Iuliana (Ilinka, Olena) Murguleț (d.1858), daughter of a Romanian boier (stolnic), and they had 12 children, of whom 7 survived: the five brothers and two sisters, Eufrozina and Eliza.

Doxaki was son of medelnicer Constantin Hurmuzachi and Roksana (d. August 12, 1818) from Moldavia.

Notable members 
Constantin (1811–1869)
Eudoxiu (1812–1878)
Gheorghe (1817–1882)
Alexandru (1823–1871)
Nicolae (1826–1909)

See also
Hurmuzachi Psalter (Psaltirea Hurmuzachi), an early (16th century) manuscript in the Romanian language
Anatol Hurmuzaki (b. 1937), academician, governmental functionary of Moldova (chief of the department of mechanization, state technical control and labour protection, Ministry of Agriculture of Moldova & other positions)

References

History of Chornivka

Romanian boyar families